ESPN International Winter Sports 2002, known in Japan as , is the name of two sports video games released in 2002 by Konami, one for the PlayStation 2, Xbox, and GameCube, and the other for the Game Boy Advance. In Japan the game is part of the Hyper Sports series, known internationally as the Track & Field series.

Reception

The game received "mixed or average reviews" on all platforms according to the review aggregation website Metacritic. In Japan, Famitsu gave it a score of 29 out of 40 for the GameCube and PlayStation 2 versions, and 26 out of 40 for the Game Boy Advance and Xbox versions.

See also
Nagano Winter Olympics '98
ESPN International Track & Field

References

External links

2002 video games
ESPN video games
Figure skating video games
GameCube games
Game Boy Advance games
Konami games
PlayStation 2 games
Skiing video games
Snowboarding video games
Xbox games
Video games developed in Japan